The Burnaby Green Party is a municipal political party in Burnaby, British Columbia. It was founded as the Burnaby Municipal Green Party in 2011 by Rick McGowan.

In 2011, the party nominated five candidates for the municipal elections, including former Green Party of British Columbia leader Jane Sterk.

The party ran a slate of 8 candidates in the municipal election on 20 October 2018 with 6 candidates for city council and 2 for school trustee.

In October 2018, party candidate Joe Keithley was elected to city council and Christine Cunningham was elected as a trustee to the Burnaby school board.

References

External links 
 

Green Party
Burnaby
Burnaby
Political parties established in 2011
2011 establishments in British Columbia
Municipal political parties in British Columbia